Joe Sweeney (16 February 1933 – 18 January 2016) was an Australian wrestler. He competed in the men's Greco-Roman bantamweight at the 1956 Summer Olympics.

References

External links
 

1933 births
2016 deaths
Australian male sport wrestlers
Olympic wrestlers of Australia
Wrestlers at the 1956 Summer Olympics
Place of birth missing